Plaything is a song by American singer Rebbie Jackson, the first single from her third album R U Tuff Enuff. It reached #8 on the US R&B chart, making it her second biggest hit on that chart after 1984's Centipede.

After Centipede and You Send the Rain Away it was the third single of hers that had an accompanying music video (overall she has four, the video for Yours Faithfully was released ten years after Plaything.)

Versions
 Plaything (Album version) –
 Plaything (7" Radio Version) – 3:50
 Plaything (Extended Dance Version) – 5:00
 Plaything (Instrumental)
 Plaything (Play Dub Version) – 5:50

Sources
 The Jackson Family Database

1988 singles
Rebbie Jackson songs
1988 songs
Columbia Records singles
New jack swing songs